Fernando Esteban Solís Núñez (born on 26 June 1976) is a Chilean football manager and former footballer.

Career
He has played over 300 Primera División de Chile games.

At international level, he made an appearance for Chile in 2001. In addition, he made an appearance for Chile B in the friendly match against Catalonia on 28 December 2001.

Honours

Club
Universidad Católica
 Primera División de Chile (1): 2002 Apertura

Universidad de Concepción
 Copa Chile (1): 2008–09

References

External links

1976 births
Living people
Footballers from Santiago
Chilean footballers
Chile international footballers
Deportes Melipilla footballers
Unión Española footballers
Club Deportivo Universidad Católica footballers
Universidad de Concepción footballers
Santiago Morning footballers
Chilean Primera División players
Primera B de Chile players
Association football defenders
Chilean football managers